Charles Brown (June 24, 1828 - ?) was an American farmer from Brookfield Center, Wisconsin, who served a single one-year term as a member of the Wisconsin State Assembly from Waukesha County during the 1872 term (the 25th Wisconsin Legislature).

Background 
Brown was born in Bristol, New Hampshire on June 24, 1828. He received a public school education, and became a farmer. He came to Wisconsin in 1856, and settled in Waukesha County.

Political office 
He was elected in 1871 for the 2nd Waukesha County Assembly district (the Towns of Delafield, Brookfield, Lisbon, Menomonee, Merton, Oconomowoc and Pewaukee) as a Republican, with 1342 votes to 1036 votes for Democrat C. M. Smith. He was assigned to the standing committees on state affairs and town and county organization.

Identity 
This Charles Brown cannot be the same as the Charles E. Brown who served in the 3rd (1845) session of the 4th Wisconsin Territorial Assembly in 1845, representing an unspecified portion of a House of Representatives district which included the present-day Milwaukee, Ozaukee, Washington, and Waukesha counties.

References 

1828 births
Farmers from Wisconsin
Republican Party members of the Wisconsin State Assembly
People from Waukesha County, Wisconsin
Year of death missing